Koongamia  is a suburb of Perth, Western Australia, located in the City of Swan local government area.

The suburb was developed as a State Housing commission suburb, and had a brief time (1960-1962) as a location on the Perth metropolitan railway system, utilising a small portion uphill from Bellevue railway station on the track of the former Mundaring Loop railway line which was suspended since 1954 and had not been officially closed.

References

Suburbs of Perth, Western Australia
Suburbs and localities in the City of Swan